Onycocaris is a genus of shrimps within the family Palaemonidae. There are currently 22 species assigned to the genus, with members spanning through areas off Kenya, Tanzania, Australia, and New Caledonia.

Species 

 Onycocaris amakusensis 
 Onycocaris aualitica 
 Onycocaris balssi 
 Onycocaris bocki 
 Onycocaris callyspongiae 
 Onycocaris fujinoi 
 Onycocaris furculata 
 Onycocaris hayamaensis 
 Onycocaris longirostris 
 Onycocaris maui 
 Onycocaris nieli 
 Onycocaris oligodentata 
 Onycocaris profunda 
 Onycocaris quadratophthalma 
 Onycocaris rudolfi 
 Onycocaris seychellensis 
 Onycocaris spinosa 
 Onycocaris stradbrokei 
 Onycocaris temiri 
 Onycocaris trullata 
 Onycocaris zanzibarica 
 Onycocaris zarenkovi

References 

Palaemonoidea
Decapod genera